Przybysław Dyjamentowski (1694–1774) was a notable Polish documents forger and writer. In his lifetime he prepared several "ancient" chronicles, diplomas and genealogies for sale. 

Dyjamentowski's forgeries were not always recognised as such, although they are now regarded as entirely pseudohistorical, and have at times been influential, even in the twenty-first century among a minority of Polish nationalists.

Prokosz Chronicle
The chronicle was supposed to stretch back the existence of Poland as an independent nation by a few generations beyond the accepted start of the Piast dynasty and support a connection between mediaeval Poles and ancient Sarmatians and peoples of East India.

See also 
 Sarmatism

References 

1694 births
1774 deaths
Forgers
Polish criminals
Polish nobility
Polish male writers